The 1997–98 Carolina Hurricanes season was the 26th season in franchise history, their 19th as a member of the National Hockey League (NHL), and their first in North Carolina. Formerly the Hartford Whalers, the team would play in Greensboro while a new arena was being constructed in Raleigh. The club finished sub-.500 and failed to qualify for the 1998 Stanley Cup playoffs.

Offseason
In March 1997, Whalers owner Peter Karmanos announced that the team would move elsewhere after the 1996–97 season because of the team's inability to negotiate a satisfactory construction and lease package for a new arena to replace the Hartford Civic Center. In July, Karmanos announced that the Whalers would move to the Research Triangle area of North Carolina and the new Entertainment and Sports Arena in Raleigh, become the Carolina Hurricanes, and change their team colors to red and black. Due to the relatively short time frame for the move, Karmanos himself thought of and decided upon the new name for the club, rather than holding a contest as is sometimes done.

Unfortunately, the ESA would not be complete for two more years.  The only arena in the Triangle with an ice plant was Dorton Arena in Raleigh, which only seated 5,100 people—too small even for temporary use.  The Hurricanes decided to play home games in Greensboro, ninety minutes away from Raleigh, for their first two seasons after the move. This choice was disastrous for the franchise's attendance and reputation. With a capacity of over 21,000 people for hockey, the Greensboro Coliseum became the highest-capacity arena in the NHL, but Triangle-area fans proved unwilling to make the drive down I-40 to Greensboro, and fans from the Piedmont Triad mostly refused to support a lame-duck team that had displaced the longtime Greensboro/Carolina Monarchs minor-league franchise. Furthermore, only 29 out of 82 games were televised, and radio play-by-play coverage on WPTF was often pre-empted by North Carolina State Wolfpack basketball (for whose broadcasts WPTF was the flagship station), leaving these games totally unavailable to those who did not have a ticket. With by far the smallest season-ticket base in the NHL and attendance routinely well below the league average, Sports Illustrated ran a story titled "Natural Disaster," and ESPN anchors mocked the "Green Acres" of empty seats; in a 2006 interview, Karmanos admitted that "as it turns out, [Greensboro] was probably a mistake."

Regular season

Final standings

Schedule and results

October
Record for the month 3-8-3 (Home 2-2-2 Away 1-6-1)

November
Record for the month 7-5-1 (Home 5-3-1 Away 2-2-0)

December
Record for the month 5-8-1 (Home 5-3-1 Away 0-5-0)

January
Record for the month 5-7-1 (Home 1-3-1 Away 4-4-0)

February
Record for the month 1-2-1 (Home 0-1-1 Away 1-1-0)

March
Record for the month 8-5-1 (Home 2-3-1 Away 6-2-0)

April
Record for the month 4-6-0 (Home 1-3-0 Away 3-3-0)

Player statistics

Regular season
Scoring

Goaltending

Note: GP = Games played; G = Goals; A = Assists; Pts = Points; +/- = Plus/minus; PIM = Penalty minutes; PPG=Power-play goals; SHG=Short-handed goals; GWG=Game-winning goals
      MIN=Minutes played; W = Wins; L = Losses; T = Ties; GA = Goals against; GAA = Goals against average; SO = Shutouts; SA=Shots against; SV=Shots saved; SV% = Save percentage;

Awards and records
Peter Karmanos, Lester Patrick Trophy

Transactions
The Hurricanes were involved in the following transactions during the 1997–98 season.

Trades

Free agents

Draft picks
Carolina's draft picks at the 1997 NHL Entry Draft held at the Civic Arena in Pittsburgh, Pennsylvania.

Farm teams
The Beast of New Haven were the Hurricanes American Hockey League affiliate for the 1998–99 AHL season.

References
 

C
C
Carolina Hurricanes seasons
Hurr
Hurr